Bernhard II, Lord of Werle [-Güstrow] (died: between 16 January 1382 and 13 April 1382) was from 1339 to 1347 Lord of Werle-Güstrow, from 1347 to 1382 Lord of Werle-Waren and from 1374 also Lord of Werle-Goldberg.

He was the youngest son of John II of Werle [-Güstrow] and his wife Matilda of Brunswick-Grubenhagen.

After the death of his father John II in 1337, his brother Nicholas III ruled Werle alone, until Bernard came of age in 1339.  They then ruled jointly until 1347.  On 14 June 1347, Werle was divided, with Bernard taking Werle-Waren.  In 1374, John IV of Werle-Goldberg died, and Bernard inherited his territory.

He was last mentioned as living in a document dated 16 January 1382.

Marriage and issue 
He married in 1341 with Elisabeth (died between 1391 and 1410), a daughter of Count John "the Mild" of the Holstein-Plön.  They had three children:
 John VI of Werle-Waren
 Mirislava Werle-Waren, who became a nun
 Matilde of Werle-Waren, married on 26 February 1377 Henry III of Mecklenburg

External links 
 Genealogical table of the House of Mecklenburg
 Biographical information on Bernhard at emecklenburg.de

Lords of Werle
House of Mecklenburg
1320s births
1382 deaths
Year of birth uncertain
14th-century German nobility